Branchinectidae is a family in the order Anostraca (fairy shrimp), containing two genera – Branchinecta and Archaebranchinecta. The majority of the species are in the genus Branchinecta, with only Archaebranchinecta pollicifera and the fossil Archaebranchinecta barstowensis in the second genus.

References

Anostraca
Crustacean families